Zawita is a town in the Dohuk Governorate, Kurdistan Region in Iraq. The name of the town is thought to come from the Syriac word for "corner."

The town is inhabited mainly by Kurds and the second biggest group is the Assyrians. At one point it was home to mostly Assyrians, prior to the Simele massacre.

A number of Assyrian Christian-owned businesses in the town were looted and burned downed during the 2011 Dohuk riots.

References

Populated places in Dohuk Province
Assyrian communities in Iraq
Kurdish settlements in Iraq

Tourist attractions in Iraqi Kurdistan